Maribella Zamarripa (born August 15, 2002) is an American tennis player.

Career
She has a career-high WTA doubles ranking of world No. 208, achieved on October 24, 2022. Up to date, she has won six doubles titles on the ITF Circuit.

Zamarripa won her biggest title to date at the 2020 Bellatorum Resources Pro Classic in the doubles event, partnering her twin sister Allura, defeating Paula Kania-Choduń and Katarzyna Piter in the final.

ITF Circuit finals

Doubles: 11 (6 titles, 5 runner–ups)

References

External links
 
 

2002 births
Living people
American female tennis players
Twin sportspeople
American twins
People from St. Helena, California
Tennis people from California
21st-century American women
Texas Longhorns women's tennis players